A Mobile Web Server is software designed for modern-day smartphones to host personal web servers, through the use of open sourced software, such as, i-jetty, an open source software, based on jetty. I-jetty is an open source web container, serving Java-based web content such as, servlets and JSPs. Jetty is written in Java and its API is available as a set of JARs. Developers can instantiate a jetty container as an object, instantly adding network and web connectivity to a stand-alone Java app. Jetty is built for scalable performance allowing tens of thousands of HTTP connections and hundreds of thousands of simultaneous web socket connections. Jetty is optimized and known for creating small memory footprints, increasing scalability and performance.

Nokia is one of the few cellphone companies that brought Apache HTTP Server to their line of Nokia cellphones, running Symbian OS S60 mobile software platform. The S60 Mobile Web Server enables connectivity for HTTP traffic to a mobile device from the Internet.

The Mobile Web Server components include a gateway application that runs on a computer with Internet access and a connector application, that runs on the remote mobile device. The gateway and the connector applications with a valid DNS configuration can provide a mobile device with a global web address (URL). However, as of January 2010, the web server project has been discontinued by Nokia.

Examples
The Mobile Web Server application allows mobile devices a means for hosting personal web applications, including, web pages and server side control. The most commonly used HTTP servers and servlet containers currently available are Jetty, Tomcat, Glassfish and Resin.

Web container comparison

Features
 Personal information manager (PIM) Manage phone's address book
 Helix multimedia player
 Send SMS messages using a web browser
 Browse phone's calendar
 Browse camera phone's image gallery via computer
 View received and missed calls
 Get instant messages sent to your phone screen.
 Maintain a blog
 Share presence status
 Online chat
 Manage access rights
 Start mobile site from the web or Settings
 Share mobile site content via RSS feeds

See also 

 Python for S60
 Apache Tomcat, alternative open source web server and servlet container
 ApacheBench, a program for measuring the performance of HTTP web servers

References

External links
Official links
 Nokia Research – Mobile Web Server
 Nokia Wiki – Mobile Web Server
 Nokia Forum – Mobile Web Server Documentation
 SourceForge – Mobile Web Server
 All About Symbian – Previewing Nokia's Mobile Web Server

Nokia services
Free web server software
Free software programmed in C
Free software programmed in C++
Free software programmed in Java (programming language)
Mobile software
S60 (software platform)
Symbian software